Oswaldo Alberto Cabrera (born March 1, 1999) is a Venezuelan professional baseball utility player for the New York Yankees of Major League Baseball (MLB).  He signed with the Yankees as a free agent when he was 16 years old. He made his MLB debut in 2022.

Career
Cabrera is from Guarenas in Venezuela. He signed with the Yankees as a free agent when he was 16 years old. Cabrera played for the Somerset Patriots of  Double-A Northeast in 2021; he led the league in hits and runs batted in, and was named the league's most valuable player. The Yankees added him to their 40-man roster, protecting him from being eligible to be selected in the Rule 5 draft, after the season. The Yankees optioned Cabrera to the Scranton/Wilkes-Barre RailRiders for the start of the 2022 season.

The Yankees promoted Cabrera to the major leagues on August 17, 2022, and he made his major league debut that day as the starting third baseman. In his first six major league games, he also started as a shortstop, second baseman, and right fielder. On September 11, Cabrera hit his first major league home run, against Tampa Bay Rays right-handed pitcher Calvin Faucher at Yankee Stadium. On September 21, Cabrera hit his first grand slam against Pittsburgh Pirates pitcher Roansy Contreras. 

In 2022, he batted .247/.312/.429 in 154 at bats for the Yankees, with six home runs and 19 RBIs. He played 27 games in right field, nine games in left field, four games at shortstop, and three games each at first base, second base, and third base.

References

External links

Living people
1999 births
Charleston RiverDogs players
Dominican Summer League Yankees players
Florida Complex League Yankees players
Gulf Coast Yankees players
Major League Baseball infielders
Major League Baseball players from Venezuela
New York Yankees players
Pulaski Yankees players
Scranton/Wilkes-Barre RailRiders players
Somerset Patriots players
Staten Island Yankees players
Tampa Tarpons players
Venezuelan expatriate baseball players in the Dominican Republic
Venezuelan expatriate baseball players in the United States